Christine To Chi-long (born 30 September 1980) is a Hong Kong film producer and screenwriter. She is best known for collaborating with her husband, Roy Chow, to wrote and produced several films such as Nightfall, Rise of the Legend and Dynasty Warriors.

Filmography

References

External links 
 
 
 
 

1980 births
Living people
Hong Kong film producers
Hong Kong screenwriters